Rafael Fiziev (born March 5, 1993) is an Azerbaijani professional mixed martial artist and Muay Thai fighter, who currently competes in the Lightweight division of the Ultimate Fighting Championship (UFC). As of October 24, 2022, he is #6 in the UFC lightweight rankings.

Early life
Fiziev was born in Korday, Kazakhstan, to an Azerbaijani father and a Russian mother. When he was a child, Fiziev's family moved to Bishkek, Kyrgyzstan.

When he was a child, Fiziev's dad bought him and his cousins boxing gloves and told them to spar. Getting beat up by his cousins, Fiziev didn't enjoy fighting and soon gave it up. It wasn't until he changed schools as a teenager that Fiziev took up Muay Thai at the age of 11 due to being bullied. While he concentrated on Muay Thai growing up, he also took up several other combat sports including combat sambo, boxing, Jiu Jitsu, and wrestling. When switching from Thai boxing to MMA, he says learning the grappling was the toughest part but his striking and standup required adjusting as well.

Muay Thai career

On April 29, 2016, Fiziev participated to the Toyota Marathon Tournament. In the quarter finals he defeated Ruslan Rybakov by decision. In the semi finals he knocked out Phakhow Darbphong 191. In Final he faced Sorgraw Petchyindee Academy who defeated him by decision.

Fiziev entered the 2017 Toyota Marathon 154 lb tournament as well, defeating Detrit Sathian Gym by decision in the semifinal. In the final he rematched Sorgraw Petchyindee Academy. He lost again by decision but went viral on social media in the process due to the impressive lean back defensive technique he displayed.

On April 21, 2017, Fiziev faced former Lumpinee Stadium champion Yodpayak Sitsongpeenong at a Muay Xtreme event in Bangkok, Thailand. Fiziev won the fight by knockout in the second round.

On September 22, 2017, Fiziev faced Leyton Collimore at Phoenix FC 3	in London, England. He was defeated by unanimous decision.

Mixed martial arts career

Early career
Fiziev made his professional MMA debut in 2015. He fought in Asian regional promotions like ROAD FC and the American promotion Titan FC before he signed with UFC.

Ultimate Fighting Championship
In his promotional debut, Fiziev faced Magomed Mustafaev on April 20, 2019, at UFC Fight Night 149. He lost the fight by first-round technical knockout.

Fiziev next faced Alex White on October 26, 2019, at UFC on ESPN+ 20. He won the fight via unanimous decision.

Fiziev faced Marc Diakiese, replacing Alan Patrick on July 19, 2020, at UFC Fight Night 172. He won the fight via unanimous decision. This fight earned him the Fight of the Night award.

On August 5, 2020, Fiziev announced on his social media that he had signed a new, four-fight contract with the UFC.

He was scheduled to face Renato Moicano on November 28, 2020, at UFC on ESPN: Blaydes vs. Lewis. However, Moicano pulled out on November 28 after testing positive for COVID-19 and the bout was rescheduled for UFC 256. Fiziev won the fight via TKO in the first round. This win earned him his first Performance of the Night award.

Fiziev faced Bobby Green on August 7, 2021, at UFC 265. He won the fight via unanimous decision. This fight earned him the Fight of the Night award.

He faced Brad Riddell at UFC on ESPN 31 on December 4, 2021. He won the fight via knockout in round three. This win earned him the Performance of the Night award.

Fiziev was scheduled to face Rafael dos Anjos on February 19, 2022, at UFC Fight Night 201. However, the bout was postponed to UFC 272 due to visa issues with Fiziev. One week before the event, Fiziev was again forced to withdraw due to testing positive for COVID-19 and was replaced by Renato Moicano. The bout was rescheduled the third time for UFC on ESPN 39 on July 9, 2022. Fiziev won the fight via knockout in round five. This win earned him the Performance of the Night award.

Fiziev faced former UFC interim Lightweight Champion Justin Gaethje on March 18, 2023, at UFC 286. He lost the back-and-forth fight via majority decision. This fight earned him the Fight of the Night bonus award.

Personal life
Outside of fighting, Fiziev enjoys blacksmithing with an emphasis on cold steel arms. He is a devout Shia Muslim.

In 2021, Fiziev revealed he would no longer be representing his home country of Kyrgyzstan during his UFC bouts due to the country's religious discrimination of Shia Muslims. He has since made Phuket, Thailand his primary residence. Fiziev now represents his father's home country of Azerbaijan, and he is also the first fighter to represent Azerbaijan in UFC history.

Championships and accomplishments

Mixed martial arts
Ultimate Fighting Championship
Fight of the Night (Three times) 
Performance of the Night (Three times) 
Combat Press
2021 Breakout Fighter of the Year

Muay Thai
Kyrgyz Muaythai Federation 
3x Kyrgyzstan Muay Thai Champion (2007, 2008, and 2009)
International Federation of Muaythai Associations
 2009 IFMA World Championships Junior 
 2011 Kazakhstan National Champion
 2016 IFMA World Championships (B-class) -71 kg 
World Muaythai Federation
 2010 WMF Intercontinental -63.5 kg Champion

Mixed martial arts record

|-
|Loss
|align=center|12–2
|Justin Gaethje
|Decision (majority)
|UFC 286
|
|align=center|3
|align=center|5:00
|London, England
|
|-
|Win
|align=center|12–1
|Rafael dos Anjos
|KO (punches)
|UFC on ESPN: dos Anjos vs. Fiziev
|
|align=center|5
|align=center|0:18
|Las Vegas, Nevada, United States
|
|-
| Win
|align=center|11–1
|Brad Riddell
|KO (spinning wheel kick)
|UFC on ESPN: Font vs. Aldo 
|

|align=center|3
|align=center|2:20
|Las Vegas, Nevada, United States
|
|-
|Win
|align=center|10–1
|Bobby Green
|Decision (unanimous)
|UFC 265 
|
|align=center|3
|align=center|5:00
|Houston, Texas, United States
|
|-
|Win
|align=center|9–1
|Renato Moicano
|KO (punches)
|UFC 256
|
|align=center|1
|align=center|4:05
|Las Vegas, Nevada, United States
|
|-
|Win
|align=center|8–1
|Marc Diakiese
|Decision (unanimous)
|UFC Fight Night: Figueiredo vs. Benavidez 2 
|
|align=center|3
|align=center|5:00
|Abu Dhabi, United Arab Emirates
|
|-
|Win
|align=center|7–1
|Alex White
|Decision (unanimous)
|UFC Fight Night: Maia vs. Askren 
|
|align=center|3
|align=center|5:00
|Kallang, Singapore
|
|-
|Loss
|align=center|6–1
|Magomed Mustafaev
|TKO (spinning back kick and punches)
|UFC Fight Night: Overeem vs. Oleinik 
|
|align=center|1
|align=center|1:26
|Saint Petersburg, Russia
|
|-
|Win
|align=center|6–0
|Nurzhan Tutaev 
|KO (body kick)
|Titan FC 51
|
|align=center|2
|align=center|0:51
|Almaty, Kazakhstan
|
|-
|Win
|align=center|5–0
|Nandin-Erdene Munguntsooj 
|KO (head kick and punches)
|Road FC 45
|
|align=center|1
|align=center|0:58
|Seoul, South Korea
|
|-
|Win
|align=center|4–0
|Kim Seung-yeon
|TKO (knees and punches)
|Road FC 39
|
|align=Center|1
|align=center|4:23
|Seoul, South Korea
|
|-
|Win
|align=center|3–0
|Suraj Bahadur
|TKO (punches)
|Primal FC: Dark Moon Rising
|
|align=Center|1
|align=center|2:30
|Phuket, Thailand
|
|-
|Win
|align=center|2–0
|Gunduz Nabiev
|Submission (rear naked choke)
|Boroda FC
|
|align=Center|1
|align=center|3:40
|Bishkek, Kyrgyzstan
|
|-
|Win
|align=center|1–0
|Sam Bastin
|KO (flying knee)
|W.I.N FC
|
|align=Center|1
|align=center|N/A
|Shenzhen, China
|

Muay Thai record

|-  style="background:#fbb;"
| 2017-09-22 || Loss ||align=left| Leyton Collymore || Phoenix FC 3 || London, England || Decision (Unanimous) || 3 || 3:00
|-  style="background:#cfc;"
| 2017-04-21 || Win ||align=left| Yodpayak Sitsongpeenong || Muay Xtreme || Bangkok, Thailand || KO (Right Cross) || 2 ||
|-  style="background:#fbb;"
| 2017-01-27 || Loss ||align=left| Sorgraw Petchyindee || Toyota Marathon, Final || Phitsanulok, Thailand || Decision || 3 || 3:00
|-
! style=background:white colspan=9 |
|-  style="background:#cfc;"
| 2017-01-27 || Win ||align=left| Dechrid Sathian Muaythai Gym || Toyota Marathon, Semi Final || Phitsanulok, Thailand || Decision || 3 || 3:00
|-  style="background:#cfc;"
| 2016-12-30 || Win ||align=left| Oasis|| Bangla Stadium || Patong, Thailand || KO (Right Cross)|| 2 ||
|-
! style=background:white colspan=9 |
|-  style="background:#cfc;"
| 2016-11- || Win ||align=left| Jilas|| Bangla Stadium, Final || Patong, Thailand || KO (Flying Knee)|| 2 ||
|-  style="background:#cfc;"
| 2016-11- || Win ||align=left| Michael || Bangla Stadium, Semi Final || Patong, Thailand || TKO (Body Kick)|| 1 ||
|-  style="background:#fbb;"
| 2016-04-29 || Loss ||align=left| Sorgraw Petchyindee || Toyota Marathon, Final || Chonburi, Thailand || Decision || 3 || 3:00
|-
! style=background:white colspan=9 |
|-  style="background:#cfc;"
| 2016-04-29 || Win ||align=left| Phakhow Darbphong 191|| Toyota Marathon, Semi Final || Chonburi, Thailand || KO (Right Cross) || 2 ||
|-  style="background:#cfc;"
| 2016-04-29 || Win ||align=left|  Ruslan Rybakov || Toyota Marathon, Quarter Final || Chonburi, Thailand || Decision || 3 || 3:00
|-  style="background:#cfc;"
| 2016-04-01 || Win ||align=left| Wuttichai|| Bangla Stadium || Patong, Thailand || KO (Spinning Back Kick)|| 2 ||
|-  style="background:#cfc;"
| 2016-02-03 || Win ||align=left| Teelek || Bangla Stadium || Patong, Thailand || KO (Punches)|| 2 ||
|-  style="background:#cfc;"
| 2015-12-27 || Win ||align=left| A Kuang Rattanachai || Bangla Stadium || Patong, Thailand || KO (Punches)|| 1 ||
|-  style="background:#cfc;"
| 2015-12-27 || Win ||align=left| Jack Keawpituk || Bangla Stadium || Patong, Thailand || KO (Overhand Right)|| 1 ||
|-  style="background:#cfc;"
| 2015-12-16 || Win ||align=left| Damien Sit.Or || Bangla Stadium || Patong, Thailand || KO (Left Hook)|| 2 ||
|-  style="background:#CCFFCC;"  
| 2012-06-28||Win||align=left| Rishat Livensho ||  || Bishkek, Kyrgyzstan ||  Decision (Unanimous)  || 3 || 3:00
|-  style="background:#CCFFCC;"  
| 2010-05-08||Win||align=left| Sergey Kulyaba ||  || Mytishchi, Russia ||  Decision  || 3 || 3:00 
|-
! style=background:white colspan=9 | 
|-
| colspan=9 | Legend:    

|-  style="background:#fbb;"
| 2016-05-25|| Loss||align=left| Denis Kolotygin || IFMA World Championships 2016, Semi Final|| Jonkoping, Sweden || TKO|| 3 ||
|-
! style=background:white colspan=9 |
|-  style="background:#cfc;"
| 2016-05-24|| Win ||align=left| Martynas Jasunias || IFMA World Championships 2016, Quarter Final|| Jonkoping, Sweden || Decision  || 3 ||
|-  style="background:#cfc;"
| 2016-05-|| Win ||align=left| Facson Perrine || IFMA World Championships 2016, Round of 16 || Jonkoping, Sweden || Decision (Unanimous)|| 3 ||
|-  style="background:#cfc;"
| 2016-05-|| Win ||align=left| Serjio Villa || IFMA World Championships 2016, Round of 32 || Jonkoping, Sweden || Decision || 3 ||

|-  style="background:#cfc;"
| 2011-09-21|| Win ||align=left| Antero Hywdnen || IFMA World Championships 2011 || Tashkent, Uzbekistan || Decision || 4 || 2:00
|-
| colspan=9 | Legend:

References

−

External links 
 
 

1993 births
Living people
People from Jambyl Region
Kyrgyzstani male kickboxers
Kazakhstani practitioners of Brazilian jiu-jitsu
Kyrgyzstani practitioners of Brazilian jiu-jitsu
Kazakhstani male mixed martial artists
Kyrgyzstani male mixed martial artists
Azerbaijani male mixed martial artists
Lightweight mixed martial artists
Mixed martial artists utilizing Muay Thai
Mixed martial artists utilizing Brazilian jiu-jitsu
Ultimate Fighting Championship male fighters
Kyrgyzstani Muay Thai practitioners
Kazakhstani emigrants to Kyrgyzstan
Kyrgyzstani emigrants to Thailand
Kyrgyzstani people of Azerbaijani descent
Kyrgyzstani people of Russian descent
Kazakhstani people of Azerbaijani descent
Kazakhstani people of Russian descent